Stevenson is a city in Jackson County, Alabama, United States, and is included in the Chattanooga-Cleveland-Dalton, TN-GA-AL Combined Statistical Area. Sources listed either 1866 or 1867 as the year of incorporation, but that seems to conflict with the dates given for the town being granted a charter. It did not first appear on the U.S. Census until 1880, where it was the second largest town in Jackson County behind Scottsboro. Since 1900, it has been the third largest town behind either Scottsboro and Bridgeport or vice versa. At the 2020 census, the population of the city was 1,955, down from 2,046 in 2010.

Geography
Stevenson is located at  (34.869442, -85.831829).

Demographics

2000 census
In the 2000 census, there were 1,770 people, 795 households, and 508 families living in the city. The racial makeup of the city was 72.88% White, 22.37% Black or African American, 0.90% Native American, 0.11% Asian, 1.30% from other races, and 2.43% from two or more races. 1.53% of the population were Hispanic or Latino of any race.

There were 795 households, of which 24.4% had children under the age of 18 living with them, 45.4% were married couples living together, 14.3% had a female householder with no husband present, and 36.1% were non-families. 34.1% of all households were made up of individuals, and 15.2% had someone living alone who was 65 years of age or older. The average household size was 2.23 and the average family size was 2.83.

21.3% of the population were under the age of 18, 8.0% from 18 to 24, 27.8% from 25 to 44, 26.4% from 45 to 64, and 16.6% who were 65 years of age or older. The median age was 40 years. For every 100 females, there were 89.1 males. For every 100 females age 18 and over, there were 85.2 males.

The median household income was $26,908 and the median family income was $34,125. Males had a median income of $27,188 compared with $21,375 for females. The per capita income for the city was $14,806. About 15.5% of families and 19.9% of the population were below the poverty line, including 26.7% of those under age 18 and 22.1% of those age 65 or over.

2010 census
In the 2010 census, there were 2,046 people, 904 households, and 554 families living in the city. The racial makeup of the city was 73.8% White, 17.4% Black or African American, 1.1% Native American, 0.4% Asian, 2.6% from other races, and 4.3% from two or more races. 3.9% of the population were Hispanic or Latino of any race.

There were 904 households, of which 24.1% had children under the age of 18 living with them, 40.7% were married couples living together, 15.7% had a female householder with no husband present, and 38.7% were non-families. 35.2% of all households were made up of individuals, and 16.0% had someone living alone who was 65 years of age or older. The average household size was 2.26 and the average family size was 2.90.

22.3% of the population were under the age of 18, 7.9% from 18 to 24, 24.1% from 25 to 44, 28.6% from 45 to 64, and 17.0% who were 65 years of age or older. The median age was 41.5 years. For every 100 females, there were 88.6 males. For every 100 females age 18 and over, there were 93.8 males.

The median household income was $241 and the median family income was $634. Males had a median income of $210 compared with $917 for females. The per capita income for the city was $14,647. About 26.6% of families and 31.8% of the population were below the poverty line, including 44.9% of those under age 18 and 25.3% of those age 65 or over.

2020 census

As of the 2020 United States census, there were 1,955 people, 729 households, and 461 families residing in the city.

Stevenson Depot 

The Stevenson Railroad Depot Museum, located in downtown Stevenson, is dedicated to preserving an important part of railroading history through the display of related artifacts. In addition, the museum displays artifacts recalling Native American culture, pioneer life, and Civil War events.

The depot, which was built in 1872 and listed in the National Register of Historic Places, stands on the ruins of Stevenson's first railroad depot, which was built around 1852 for common use by the Nashville Chattanooga and the Memphis & Charleston Railroads. That original depot was destroyed either during, or shortly after, the Civil War. Bricks salvaged may have been used in the building of the present structure.

Fort Harker 

Constructed by the Union Army in summer 1862 and expanded in 1864, using soldiers and slaves, Fort Harker was built on a broad hill a quarter-mile east of the town of Stevenson. It overlooked Crow Creek and was well within firing range of Stevenson’s strategic railroad lines, supply depots and warehouses. It contained 7 cannon platforms, a bomb-proof powder magazine, a draw-bridge entrance and an 8-sided wooden blockhouse at its center. Fort Harker was critical to Union plans. No major fighting occurred here, but skirmishes and sniper attacks were common as territory traded hands between Union and Confederate forces. One other large fort, two smaller redoubts and at least seven blockhouses were constructed along the railroad lines at Stevenson during the Civil War. Stevenson was the major junction for the Memphis and Charleston Railroad and the Nashville and Chattanooga Railroad. In addition to forts, the Union Army established a medical facility and a refugee camp at Stevenson. The remains of Gen. Rosecrans’ headquarters is on the National Register of Historic Places. Both may be seen near downtown Stevenson today.

Depot Days 
Every June, the town of Stevenson holds the annual Depot Days celebration. This celebration includes many different aspects of the southern town's culture and celebrates the great things that Stevenson represents. The week-long celebration is concluded with a parade, a day full of activities, and a street dance in the middle of Downtown Stevenson.

North Jackson High School 
Stevenson is the location of the North Jackson High School. In 1993, the school won the Alabama 4A State Title in football. They reached the finals again in 2002, when they were defeated by UMS-Wright 7-3.

Notable people
 Hank Allison, former NFL player
 Jacob Lyda, country music singer
 Carl McNabb, former professional baseball player
 Mack Stewart, former professional baseball player
 Byron Wimberly, former professional football player

Gallery

References

External links
Stevenson Depot museum
Stevenson Depot Days. Com

Cities in Alabama
Cities in Jackson County, Alabama
Alabama populated places on the Tennessee River